Ted Ness (20 May 1888 – 18 September 1967) was a British gymnast. He competed in the men's team all-around event at the 1920 Summer Olympics.

References

1888 births
1967 deaths
British male artistic gymnasts
Olympic gymnasts of Great Britain
Gymnasts at the 1920 Summer Olympics
Sportspeople from Prestwich